Lynchburg is a former settlement in Butte County, California, United States. Lynchburg was founded in 1848 by and named for George H. Lynch, a local storeowner. Wooden buildings were erected in the area and the population grew. Lynchburg emerged as a competitor of Ophir City, and by 1855 had outgrown its rival settlement. Once a lively place, Lynchburg began to wither by the mid-1850s.

References

Former settlements in Butte County, California
Former populated places in California
Populated places established in 1848